The 2000 Ball State Cardinals football team was an American football team that represented Ball State University in the West Division of the Mid-American Conference (MAC) during the 2000 NCAA Division I-A football season. In its sixth season under head coach Bill Lynch, the team compiled a 5–6 record (2–3 against conference opponents) and tied for third place in the MAC West. The team played its home games at Ball State Stadium in Muncie, Indiana.

The team's statistical leaders included Talmadge Hill with 1,455 passing yards, Marcus Merriweather with 1,004 rushing yards and 48 points scored, and Sean Schembra with 484 receiving yards.

Schedule

References

Ball State
Ball State Cardinals football seasons
Ball State Cardinals football